Swingtown is an American drama television series created by Mike Kelley as a summer replacement series for CBS aired from June 5 to September 5, 2008. The show was a period and relationship drama about the impact of sexual and social liberation in 1970s American suburban households, with story arcs involving open marriages and key parties.

Overview
Swingtown premiered on Thursday June 5, 2008, in the time slot previously occupied by Without a Trace.  The show was also picked up by Global in Canada, ITV3 in the United Kingdom, TV3 Ireland in Ireland, Network Ten in Australia, Rai 4 in Italy, Warner Channel in South America, and Universal Channel in Poland, TV 2 in Norway, Channel Four in New Zealand, and Romania.

After seven episodes of declining ratings, CBS moved the show's US airing to Fridays, swapping with Flashpoint, which had outperformed Swingtown despite airing in a less favorable time slot.  Swingtown's first season's finale (ultimately the de facto series finale) aired on September 5.

Although the show's cancellation was suspected well in advance, it was made official on January 14, 2009.

Premise
Set in the summer of 1976, the series begins with the relocation of the Miller family to a more affluent neighborhood in the North Shore, a suburban area of Chicago. Bruce Miller (played by Jack Davenport) is a futures trader working his way up in the business, married to Susan (Molly Parker). Susan Miller is a homemaker who got pregnant and married Bruce in high school. The couple have a teenage daughter, Laurie (Shanna Collins), and a young son Bruce Junior, nicknamed B.J. (Aaron Howles).

Tom and Trina Decker (Grant Show and Lana Parrilla) are the Millers' new neighbors. Tom, an airline pilot, met Trina while she was a stewardess. The Deckers quickly befriend the Millers, and the Millers just as quickly learn that their new neighbors have an open marriage.  The move strains the Millers' friendship with Roger and Janet Thompson (Josh Hopkins and Miriam Shor), their more conservative neighbors and friends from their old neighborhood. They try to maintain their friendship with the Millers, but the Thompsons are appalled when they learn about the Deckers' marital arrangement.  The Thompsons have a son, Rick (Nick Benson).

Although the show mostly focuses on the three couples, their children's stories are followed too, particularly Laurie, who is attracted to her summer school philosophy teacher (Michael Rady).  B.J. and Rick's friendship is also tested by the move, and B.J. meets Samantha Saxton (Brittany Robertson), an enigmatic girl who lives next door to him in his new neighborhood.

Cast

Main
Jack Davenport as Bruce Miller Sr.
Molly Parker as Susan Miller
Lana Parrilla as Trina Decker
Grant Show as Tom Decker
Miriam Shor as Janet Thompson
Josh Hopkins as Roger Thompson
Shanna Collins as Laurie Miller
Aaron Howles as Bruce "B.J." Miller Jr.
Michael Rady as Doug Stephens
Brittany Robertson as Samantha Saxton

Recurring
Nick Benson as Rick Thompson 
Kate Norby as Gail Saxton 
Rachelle Lefevre as Melinda, Bruce's co-worker 
Rick Peters as Tony Mareno 
Kyle Searles as Logan Rhode 
Erin Daniels as Sylvia Davis 
Mark Valley as Brad Davis

Pre-production
Producers Mike Kelley (head writer) and  Alan Poul first pitched their idea to HBO, where Poul, who had worked on Six Feet Under, had a development deal.   Poul said HBO passed on the opportunity at least in part because it already had Big Love in production and Tell Me You Love Me in development.  The two next approached Showtime, but before discussions with that network went anywhere, CBS Entertainment president Nina Tassler found out about the proposal and within a couple of days, had read the script; she gave the series the greenlight in May 2007. The script, written in anticipation of a cable network deal, had to be rewritten for American broadcast television standards, all but eliminating the nudity and the explicit depiction of sexual acts.  CBS ordered 13 episodes from CBS Paramount Television.

Reception
The 26 critics included in the show's Metacritic gave it mixed reviews (a "metascore" of 49).  Variety said the series "exhibits rare depth" and includes "plenty of nifty touches, from the pop-song score and Boogie Nights fashions to the first-rate cast."  The Hollywood Reporter said "even skillful performances by its largely unknown cast aren't able to hide the lack of character development and the sense that the people in this series are almost self-parodies."  Salon called it "stylish and '70s-sexy but also shallow enough to feel like a less funny, hollowed-out combination of The Wonder Years and Boogie Nights — which is exactly what the show's creators told the New York Times they were aiming for (without using the words 'less funny' and 'hollowed-out' of course)."

Controversy
The American Family Association urged members to write letters of complaint to the media, while the Parents Television Council followed a failed boycott attempt with an effort to convince CBS affiliates to preempt the program. Procter & Gamble and Ace Hardware stopped advertising on the serial.

Lindsay Soll writes that one "producer thinks of sophisticated swingers Tom and Trina (Show and Parilla) in a ‘Great Gatsby-like way,’ calling them 'the shining couple across the street.'  Exactly why we'd get in bed with them--er, the show."

Audience interest dwindled as the summer progressed.  After a strong pilot episode, the ratings for Swingtown got progressively worse, aided by a mid-season move from Thursdays to Friday.

According to executive producer Alan Poul, the first season ending was shot with the show's uncertain future in mind:
The season ends with a cliffhanger, but it's also a completely satisfying ending.  So, if we go forward, there are many new things that are set up to explore. And if we don't go forward, there's no feeling that we've been left with something incomplete.

The poor ratings led CBS to see if any cable networks, or perhaps DirecTV, were interested in picking it up.  Bravo decided to acquire rights to the existing episodes, but did not order any new ones.

Episodes
Episodes feature songs of the period performed by the original artists; Last.fm, owned by CBS Interactive, features the songs from the show in a sponsored group cross-promoted during each episode.

Ratings
There were low ratings for the first seven episodes — the seven Thursday night episodes averaged 6.7 million viewers and a 2.3 rating in adults 18-49 — led CBS to move Swingtown from Thursdays to Fridays. Following the change, the ratings for the next four episodes averaged just 3.9 million viewers, with an average 1.3 rating in the 18-49 demographic.

Home media
The complete series was released on DVD on December 9, 2008 and recently was re-release on June 18, 2019.

See also
Plato's Retreat
Open marriage
American Swing
The Lifestyle

Footnotes

References

External links 

Swingtown at Last.fm (a CBS Interactive website)
Courant
Variety

Television series by CBS Studios
CBS original programming
Television series set in the 1970s
2000s American drama television series
2008 American television series debuts
2008 American television series endings
Television shows set in Chicago
Group sex
 
Free sex
Infidelity in television
Casual sex in television
Sexuality and gender identity-based cultures